Liam de Róiste (born William Roche; 15 June 1882 – 15 May 1959) was an Irish Sinn Féin politician, diarist and Gaelic scholar.

Early life
He was born in Fountainstown, County Cork, the son of Edward Roche (originally from Tipperary) and Eliza Ahern, who were both primary school teachers.

At the age of 17, he began working in a Cork drapery store. Later, he assumed a teaching post at Skerry's College.

A supporter of the Irish language, which he spoke, he was founder member in 1899 of the Cork branch of the Gaelic League.

Political activities
As vice-chairman of Sinn Féin in Cork, he chaired its first meeting in 1906. A prominent early member of the Irish Volunteers movement, he took part in the march to Macroom on Easter Sunday 1916 and later in helping to smuggle arms for the IRA.

He was elected as a Sinn Féin MP for the Cork City constituency at the 1918 general election. In January 1919, Sinn Féin MPs refused to recognise the Parliament of the United Kingdom and instead assembled at the Mansion House in Dublin as a revolutionary parliament called Dáil Éireann, though de Róiste was unable to attend.

De Róiste opposed the Belfast Boycott stating in a 1920 Dáil debate; "it would mean having to purchase English-made goods instead of Belfast-made articles. Economic penetration was the solution of the Ulster question.

In April, 1921 while staying at a neighbours for fear of assassination, the family home was stormed by a party of Black and Tans. A personal friend and Catholic priest, James O'Callaghan, evidently mistaken for his host, was shot and killed while investigating the disturbance downstairs. The intruders left unopposed.

De Róiste was re-elected without contest at the 1921 elections for the Cork Borough constituency. He supported the Anglo-Irish Treaty and voted in favour of it. He was again re-elected in the 1922 general election as a member of pro-Treaty Sinn Féin. In the lead up to the Irish Civil War, he tried, as part of a group, to reconcile the pro- and anti-Treaty sides, a move which alienated many of his supporters, which effectively ended his political career. He did not stand at the 1923 general election but stood unsuccessfully as a Cumann na nGaedheal candidate at the June 1927 general election.

De Róiste was active in local politics in Cork, serving on Cork Corporation from 1920 to 1922. In 1929, he was one of three Cumann na Gael members of the reformed Cork Corporation, losing his seat in the early 1930s.

In 1936–1937, he was involved with the Irish Christian Front, which supported Franco in the Spanish Civil War.

In the following decade, he was one of five councillors for the Cork Civic Party. He retired from politics in 1950.

De Róiste was sympathetic to the fascist and anti-Semitic Ailtirí na hAiséirghe party.

In his private life he was Secretary and Director of the Irish International Trading Corporation, Cork, and an author. He died on 15 May 1959, and is buried at St. Joseph's Cemetery, Ballyphehane, Cork.

References

External links
 Liam de Róiste Diaries 1914–1917 digitised at Cork City and County Archives

1882 births
1969 deaths
Early Sinn Féin TDs
Cumann na nGaedheal politicians
Members of the 1st Dáil
Members of the 2nd Dáil
Members of the 3rd Dáil
Members of the Parliament of the United Kingdom for Cork City
UK MPs 1918–1922
Irish fascists
Politicians from County Cork
People of the Irish Civil War (Pro-Treaty side)
Cork Civic Party politicians